The Military Logistics Academy, officially known as the Military Academy of Logistical Support "General of the Army A. V. Khrulyov" a subordinate school of the Russian Ground Forces, is located in the northern city Saint Petersburg. It was created in 1918. It trains officers and NCO's for the rear services and the Transportation Forces. It is currently led by Lieutenant General Andrey Toporov.

History
It traces its history from the Quartermaster Course of the Imperial Russian Army, formed on 31 March 1900, when Emperor Nicholas II approved the "Regulations on the Quartermaster Course" in Petrograd. In 1918, it was reorganized into the Military Economic Academy of the Red Army. Over 1,000 students of the academy took part in the Russian Civil War, with many serving in positions in the Eastern, Turkestan and other fronts. By the time the Great Patriotic War began, more than 13,000 qualified logistic specialists were by the academy. In early 1938, the academy was relocated to Leningrad. In 1956, it was merged with the Military Academy of Logistics and Supply into the Military Academy of Logistics and Transport. In 1998, the academy on the rights of its branches includes the Volsk Higher School of Logistics and the Ulyanovsk Higher Military Technical School. In 2008, the Volga Higher Military School of Logistics, the Ulyanovsk Higher Military Technical School of Logistics (Military Institute), and the Military Transport University of Railway Troops and Military Communications were attached to the academy as a branch.

Structure
The academy has the following organization:
 Military Institute (Railway troops and military communications) of the Military Academy of Logistics
 Military Engineering University
 Volsk Branch
 Omsk Branch
 Penza Branch

The academy sports the following departments:

 Department of Logistical Organization
 Department of Command and Control
 Department of Logistics
 Department of the Material and Technical Organization of the Navy
 Department of Military Communications
 Department of Tactics and Operations
 Department of Railway Troops
 Department of the Construction of Military Bridges and Tunnels
 Department of Road Service
 Department of Humanitarian and Socio-economic Disciplines
 Department of General Scientific and Technical Disciplines
 Department of Physical Fitness
 Rear Department of the National Guard of Russia
 Department of Logistics of the Border Service of the Federal Security Service

Student life
There are currently 1,400 students at the academy.

Traditions

Parades
It is an annual participant in the Moscow Victory Day Parade on Red Square. The 2016 parade, for the very first time, featured women officers and other ranks from the academy and the Military University of the Ministry of Defence of the Russian Federation. They have marched in the parade since then. During the 2020 edition of the parade, cadets led by academy commandant Andrey Toporov were dressed in the historical part of the parade in the uniforms of participants in the Moscow Victory Parade of 1945. In addition, over 100 cadets take part in the Victory Day Parade on Saint Petersburg's Palace Square, as well as similar events held in the Volsk, Penza and Omsk.

Namesake
The school is named after Army General Andrey Khrulyov, who is known well for developing the Red Army logistic system. He is also one of the few men with his rank to be buried in the Kremlin Wall Necropolis. The decision to give the honorific to the academy was made in 2003. By resolution of academy commandant, the year 2017 was declared as the year of "the great intendant General of the Army Andrey Vasilyevich Khrulyov". This was done In connection with the 125th birthday of Khrulyov. That year, a number of commemorative events were organized at the academy.

Cadet band
The military band of the academy was founded in 1943 of the Higher Officers' Artillery and Technical School in Tula. It is an integral part of the academy's Penza branch, with the military band being attached to it. It provides support to events in the Penza Oblast. The band has often been awarded for its performances and everyday service.

Awards
Order of Kutuzov
Order of Lenin
Order of the Red Banner
Order of the Red Banner (Afghanistan)
Order of the Red Banner (People's Republic of Mongolia)
Order of the Red Banner (People's Republic of Bulgaria)
Order of the People's Republic of Bulgaria
Order of the Red Banner (Czechoslovakia)
Order of Merit of the Republic of Poland
Jubilee Badge of Honor to Commemorate the 50th Anniversary of the Formation of the USSR
Battle Order "For Merit to the People and the Fatherland" (German Democratic Republic)

Heads
 Lieutenant General Nikolai Solovyov (1900–1907)
 Infantry General Vladimir Bukholts
 Major General Pyotr Yakubinsky (1918–1919)
 Major General Georgy Livadin (1920)
 Mikhail Lezgintsev (1920)
 Nikolai Suleiman (1920–1921)
 Nikolai Deutsch (1922–1925)
 Commissar 2nd rank Alexander Shifres (1936–1937)
 Corps Commander Semyon Pugachev (1932–1938)
 Lieutenant General of Technical Troops Viktor Filichkin (1937–1946)
 Lieutenant General Pyotr Davydov (1937–1945)
 Colonel General Vladimir Vostrukhov (1946–1949)
 Lieutenant General Alexander Chernyakov (1950–1956)
 Colonel General Mikhail Milovsky (1956–1965)
 Colonel General Konstantin Abramov (1965–1986)
 Colonel General Gennady Pastukhovsky (February 1986 – September 1991)
 Colonel General Anatoly Ermakov (May 1991 – April 2000)
 Lieutenant General Valery Moskovchenko (April 2000 – 2009)
 Major General Alexander Tselykovskikh (June 2010 – 2012)
 Lieutenant General Vladimir Ivanovsky (September 2012 – August 2016)
 Lieutenant General Andrey Toporov (August 2016 – present)

Notable graduates

Among the notable graduates are 15 people with the title of Hero of the Soviet Union and another 15 who are recipients of the Hero of Socialist Labor. Other graduates include:

Igor Levitin, former Russian Minister of Transport.
Mammadrafi Mammadov, 9th Minister of Defense of Azerbaijan 
Mikhail Mikhin
Alexander Pylcyn
Roman Putin, great-nephew of Russian President Vladimir Putin.

See also
Army Logistics University

References

External links
 Официальный сайт Вольского филиала академии
 Страница академии на сайте Минобороны
 Академия на сайте «Всеобуч»

Educational institutions established in 1918
Military logistics of Russia
Military academies of Russia
1918 establishments in Russia